Kateryna Kryva (born 6 February 1992) is a Ukrainian karateka. She won the gold medal in the women's 50 kg and women's team kumite events at the 2017 European Karate Championships held in İzmit, Turkey. She also won one of the bronze medals in the women's 50 kg event at the 2021 World Karate Championships held in Dubai, United Arab Emirates.

In 2017, she competed in the women's kumite 50 kg event at the World Games in Wrocław, Poland.

In May 2021, she won one of the bronze medals in the women's 50 kg event at the European Karate Championships held in Poreč, Croatia.

She competed in the women's 50 kg at the 2022 World Games held in Birmingham, United States.

References 

Living people
1992 births
Ukrainian female karateka
Karateka at the 2015 European Games
Karateka at the 2019 European Games
European Games competitors for Ukraine
Competitors at the 2017 World Games
Competitors at the 2022 World Games
Sportspeople from Khmelnytskyi Oblast
21st-century Ukrainian women